The AGO S.I was a German prototype ground-attack aircraft built in October 1918 but possibly never flown before the end of World War I. It was a single-seat biplane armed with a downwards-firing 20 mm cannon.

Specifications

References

 

1910s German attack aircraft
S.I